Mary Carter Smith (1919 – April 24, 2007) was a noted American educator who helped revive storytelling as an educational tool. She graduated from Coppin State University and was a teacher in the Baltimore City Public School system for thirty-one years. Additionally, she was a co-founder of Big Brothers-Big Sisters of Maryland, founding member of Big Brothers-Big Sisters of America, the Arena Players theatre company and the Griots' Circle of Maryland.

She hosted a Saturday morning radio program, "Griot for the Young and the Young at Heart" and, in 1983, Mary Smith was named the official Griot of Baltimore City and, in 1991, the official Griot of Maryland.

Awards and notable achievements
 1982: co-founded The National Association of Black Storytellers
 1985: awarded the Zora Neale Hurston Award
 1996: Lifetime Achievement Award and The Circle of Excellence Award from the National Storytelling Association
 Her image is featured at the National Great Blacks In Wax Museum in Baltimore, Maryland

References

External links
 Biography at Maryland Archives
 

1919 births
2007 deaths
Coppin State University alumni
Educators from Maryland
People from Baltimore
American storytellers
Women storytellers
20th-century American educators
20th-century American women educators
20th-century African-American women
20th-century African-American people
20th-century African-American educators
21st-century African-American people
21st-century African-American women